Okus is a suburb of Swindon, Wiltshire, United Kingdom. It is south of the town centre and is home to the Commonweal School, a secondary school with academy status.

External links

Swindon